Daniel S. Zion (3 August 1883, Salonica – 13 November 1979, Jaffa) was an Orthodox rabbi, Kabbalist and political activist. Zion moved to Sofia, Bulgaria, as a slaughterer and cantor. Bulgaria's Jewish community at the time was almost completely assimilated, and there were no ultra-Orthodox communities in the country during World War II. In 1943, Zion was removed from his position on the local rabbinic court for his newfound belief that Jesus of Nazareth was the Jewish Messiah.

The Holocaust in Bulgaria and subsequent life in Israel 
In May 1943, alongside Chief Rabbi Dr. Asher Hananel (1895–1964), Zion helped prevent the deportation of 800 Jews from Sofia. They did so by appealing to the Metropolitan Bishop of Sofia, Metropolitan Stefan, then head of the Bulgarian Orthodox Church in Sofia. Bishop Stefan then appealed to Tsar Boris III.

On 24 May 1943, Rabbi Zion addressed a gathering at a synagogue, then participated in a mass street demonstration against the anti-Jewish Law for protection of the nation. This law was in effect between 23 January 1941 to 27 November 1944.

Two days after the demonstration, Zion was arrested among many others. Having previously enjoyed refuge under the protection of Bishop Stefan, he was transported to a concentration camp for Jews at Somovit, on the bank of the Danube.

After the war, Communist interests appointed Zion Chief Rabbi of Sofia. As a result, he was given the moniker "the Red Rabbi.". In 1949, Zion immigrated to Jaffa in the newly formed state of Israel.

In June 1950, for reasons to be discussed in the following section, a panel of Israeli rabbis ruled that Zion was mentally ill and removed him from the position of rabbi in Jaffa.

Relationship with Christianity 
Not long after his arrival in Israel, Rabbi Zion was accused of having an interest in Dunovism, a Bulgarian mystical Christian sect led by Peter Deunov. Dunovism combined elements of Orthodox Christianity with local Bulgarian religious practices.

On 13 June 1950, an Israeli periodical reported that the then Chief Ashkenazi Rabbi of Tel Aviv, Rabbi Isser Yehudah Unterman (1946-1964), had interviewed Sephardi Jews who knew Zion personally.

The Sephardim reported that Zion had become increasingly anxious in recent times. They claimed that he had fasted for three days and he was hallucinating and experiencing visions. Ultimately, a conference of rabbis declared him "insane." Zion was not allowed to enter any synagogue in the city of Jaffa. He was relieved from his duties as a judge on the Beit din, ostensibly because Zion had come to hold a faith in Jesus.

Zion was interviewed on 14 September 1952 by Kol Yisrael Radio, the national radio station, which was broadcast in Jerusalem. He expressed his view that Jesus fulfilled the various messianic prophecies. Zion further claimed that he served as the president of the Union of Messianic Jews in Israel (Ichud Yehudim Meshihiim Be-Israel), an organization founded by Abram Poljak.

Works 
 Iz Nov Put,(Sofia, 1941)
 Pet godini pod fashistki gnet, (Memoir: Five Years Under Fascist Oppression), (Sofia, 1945)
 Troiniya put na Noviya Chovek, (Sofia, 1946)
 Seder ha-Tephilot: Tephilat Daniel(Sofia, 1946)

References

Books 
 Friends' Intelligencer, (1950), (Volume 107, Nos. 26-52), Pg. 614
 American Jewish Year Book, (1951), (Volume 52), Pg. 361
 Annual :Organization of the Jews in Bulgaria "Shalom"(1951, 1970, 1980, 1984 and 1987)
 Arendt, H. Eichmann in Jerusalem: A Report on the Banality of Evil, (Viking Press, 1963), Pg. 169
 Boyadjieff, C. Saving the Bulgarian Jews in World War II (Free Bulgaria Centre, 1989)
 Chary, F.B. The Bulgarian Jews and the Final Solution, 1940-1944 (University of Pittsburgh Press, 1977)
 Chary, F.B. "Bulgaria," Wyman, D.S. and Rosenzveig, C.H. (eds.), The world reacts to the Holocaust (Johns Hopkins University Press, 1996)
 Fein, H. Accounting for Genocide: National Responses and Jewish Victimization during the Holocaust, (Free Press, 1979)
 Groueff, S. Crown of thorns: The Reign of King Boris III of Bulgaria, 1918-1943 (Madison Books, 1987)
 Haskell, G.H. From Sofia to Jaffa: The Jews of Bulgaria and Israel,' (Wayne State University Press, 1994.)
 Koen, A. and Assa, Saving of the Jews in Bulgaria, 1941-1944 (Setemvri, 1977)
 Rothkirchen, L. Yad Vashem Studies on the European Jewish Catastrophe and Resistance, (Volume 7), (Yad Vashem, 1968)
 Sachar, H.M. Farewell España: The World of the Sephardim Remembered (Howard Morley, 1994)
 Steinhouse, C.L. Wily Fox: How King Boris Saved the Jews of Bulgaria From the Clutches of His Axis Ally Adolf Hitler, (AuthorHouse, 2008)

External links 
 theoptimists.com
 "The Bulgarian Orthodox Church and the Holocaust: Addressing Common Misconceptions" - Occasional Papers on Religion in Eastern Europe
 tu-berlin.de

1881 births
20th-century rabbis from the Ottoman Empire
Rabbis from Thessaloniki
Bulgarian Orthodox rabbis
Kabbalists
The Holocaust in Bulgaria
Bulgarian emigrants to Israel
Bulgarian Jews in Israel
1979 deaths